The National Theatre Brno is an opera, ballet and drama company in the Czech Republic, that nation's second busiest. It was established in 1884 on the model of the National Theatre company in Prague. Today it runs the biennial Janáček Festival, in November, and has three venues: 
 Janáček Theatre, the largest, completed in 1965
 Mahen Theatre, originally the German-language Theatre on the Walls, with some 700 seats; finished in 1882; first theatre on the Continent with electric lighting (designed by Thomas Alva Edison himself); site of the premieres of Janáček's greatest operas
 Reduta Theatre, the oldest theatre house in Central Europe, recently reconstructed; in December 1767 the twelve-year-old Wolfgang Amadeus Mozart gave a concert there

References

External links

 

Opera houses in the Czech Republic
Brno, National Theatre (Brno)
Theatres in Brno
Theatres completed in 1884
Music venues completed in 1884
1884 establishments in Austria-Hungary
19th-century establishments in Bohemia
19th-century architecture in the Czech Republic